L.O.D. (an acronym for Life of Desiigner) is the first extended play (EP) by American rapper Desiigner. It was released on May 4, 2018, through GOOD Music and Def Jam. The EP features production from Mike Dean, Ronny J, and Sean Garrett, among others. It serves as Desiigner's first full-length project since the release of his debut mixtape New English (2016). It is the last project released by Desiigner through GOOD Music.

Background 
Desiigner first announced the project as one of two albums he had produced on his Twitter in November 2017. There was no further discussion on the two albums until May 3, 2018, when he announced that the album, titled L.O.D. would be released as an EP (extended play) at midnight. Desiigner's representative confirmed to Pitchfork that L.O.D. is an EP despite it being called an album on the artwork.

Track listing 
Credits adapted from Tidal.

Notes
  signifies a co-producer
  signifies an additional producer

Personnel 
Credits adapted from Tidal.

Musicians
 Mike Dean – additional keyboards , rhodes, synth bass 
 Yasmeen Al-Mazeedi – violin 
 Johan – string arranger 

Technical
 Tom Kahre – recording , mixing assistance 
 Jenna Felsenthal – recording assistance 
 Jason Pezzotti – recording 
 Marlon Adams – recording 
 Devonne Knights – recording 
 Carlos Vives – recording 
 Corey Nutile – recording 
 Gaylord Kalani – recording assistance 
 Fahad Rahman – recording assistance 
 Ryan Potts – recording assistance 
 Mike Dean – mixing 
 Sean Solymar – mixing assistance

Charts

References 

2018 debut EPs
Desiigner albums
Albums produced by Mike Dean (record producer)
Albums produced by Ronny J
Albums produced by Sean Garrett